The EHL Swiss School of Tourism and Hospitality (EHL SSTH) is a Swiss hotel management school located in Passugg, a Village outside of Chur, Switzerland.  The School was founded in 1966, and joined the EHL group in 2013. An average of 350 students from 30 different countries are educated each semester. The hotel management school offers federally recognized qualifications, ranging from basic vocational training and higher education to Bachelor of Science degrees. The EHL Campus Passugg is built around a 19th-century spa hotel and includes several buildings, offering accommodations and five in-house restaurants.

History

Foundation of the hotel management school 
In 1966, Markus Christoffel founded the hotel department of the hotel secretarial school in Chur to train specialists and managers for the tourism and hospitality industry.

In 1972, the first Special Course in English was launched, which, thanks to the international reputation of the Swiss educational landscape, attracted students from the around the globe. As a result, the school gradually developed into a higher technical college with training programs of varying levels and multiple languages.

History of the school hotel 
Today the EHL SSTH is located in outside of Chur in the historic small village of Passugg.  Passugg was chosen due to the belief in the medical benefits of its springs, which dates back to as early as 1562.

At the end of the 19th century, an increased interest in Alpine tourism attracted many people to the mountains. One of these people was Ulrich Sprecher, a saddler and upholsterer master craftsman from Chur, who was in the area around Passugg to prospect for gold and rediscovered the medicinal springs.

The mountains and the Swiss springs were thought to cure many diseases. The Passugg Ulricus Spring, whose water was used to treat stomach disorders, became particularly famous. The inn was subsequently transformed into a spa hotel. Guests from all over the world travelled to Passugg for the belief in the healing power of the springs.

An excerpt from the guest list from 1911 shows how international the visitors of the spa hotel were. They came from Buenos Aires, Chicago and Paris to Passugg to enjoy the springs. After the decline of spa tourism, students from all over the world now once again populate the spa hotel. Since 1991, the EHL SSTH has been located in the historic health resort Passugg. The former health resort is the heart of the EHL Campus Passugg.

Member of the EHL Group 
The EHL SSTH has been part of the EHL Group since 2013. The EHL Group is also the owner of the Ecole hôtelière de Lausanne (EHL), the oldest and most famous hotel management school in the world. The Ecole hôtelière de Lausanne and EHL SSTH work closely together. The training courses are coordinated and adapted to the latest needs of the hospitality industry.

Educational Programs and Degrees 
Within the EHL Group, students at the EHL SSTH benefit from a unique and acknowledged training program: from basic professional training, through the hotel management studies at a higher technical college, to a bachelor's degree in International Hospitality Management. All training programs are federally recognized.

The following diplomas can be obtained at the EHL SSTH:

 Hotel communication specialist EFZ (Federal Certificate of Vocational Training)
 Swiss Professional Degree in Hospitality Management (Dipl. Hôtelière-Restauratrice HF / Dipl. Hôtelier-Restaurateur HF)
 Bachelor of Science in International Hospitality Management

Hotel communication specialist EFZ 
The three-year school-based basic professional training equips future hotel communication specialists (HoKo) with sound operational knowledge and soft skills. During their HoKo apprenticeship, they gain insight into the various areas of hospitality, such as kitchen, housekeeping, service and hotel reception. In addition to communication skills, the apprenticeship focuses on hotel guests and their needs regarding the hotel experience. 

Half of the HoKo apprenticeship takes place on the EHL Campus Passugg and the other half in two internships in different hotel companies. After the apprenticeship, there is the possibility to complete the hotel management studies at the higher technical college in two years instead of three.

Swiss Professional Degree in Hospitality Management 
The EHL SSTH puts entrepreneurial and practical thinking into practice with a three-year, competence-oriented hotel management course. Academic management courses such as economics, marketing, HR and communication are combined with a wide range of practical courses in all operational areas of the hotel and catering industry, i.e. kitchen, service, reception and home economics. In the sixth semester, students can specialize in Culinary Arts or Spa & Wellness Management.

EHL SSTH graduates have at least two years of work experience before completing their hotel management studies, thanks to the internships supervised by the hotel management school. The EHL SSTH is the only hotel management school in Switzerland that offers federally recognized hotel management courses in German and English.

Bachelor of Science in International Hospitality Management 
After graduation from the Higher Professional School, the EHL Bachelor of Science in International Hospitality Management HES-SO can be affiliated. This is based on the curriculum of the Ecole hôtelière de Lausanne (EHL). The EHL Bachelor offers future hospitality specialists and managers a balanced curriculum that combines management theory and applied business projects.

The EHL Bachelor of Science in International Hospitality Management is the only federally recognized bachelor's degree in the Bologna system. Graduates can pursue further studies at the EHL or other universities.

The EHL Bachelor of Science degree is the only federally recognized bachelor's degree in Hospitality Management. Thanks to its recognition, all further training options in terms of university and transfer are open to EHL Bachelor graduates.

Educational Philosophy 
The EHL SSTH stands for the dual education system in Switzerland and combines academic and practical learning. Upon completion of the Hospitality Management degree program (HF), graduates have at least two years of practical experience.

The aim of the EHL SSTH is not only to impart theoretical management knowledge and to immerse students in practical courses but to strengthen their emotional intelligence and soft skills. The focus of the lessons is on the individual emotions of guests and the question of which skills lead to inspiring customer experience. To provide excellent service, hospitality students must learn to listen and communicate well.

Campus 
The EHL Campus Passugg is home to 350 learners and students from 30 nations. They are accommodated in three buildings - the School Hotel, Fontana and Bachelor Village.

In addition to accommodation facilities, the campus offers modern classrooms and meeting places for students. A Securitas service is responsible for campus security 24/7.

Inhouse restaurants 

On the EHL Campus Passugg, there are five training restaurants under one roof. The students under the supervision of experts run the restaurants. Each restaurant follows its philosophy and cuisine.

Umami 
The restaurant "Umami" offers Asian cuisine with dishes like sushi, poké and noodle soups. Students and apprentices prepare the dishes under the guidance of a practice teacher at a Live Cooking Station.

Da Fortunat 
The "Da Fortunat" is dedicated to Swiss cuisine. Regional and organic products are at the centre of attention. Bündner specialities such as Maluns and Capuns are served.

Campigiana 

The bistro and bar is called "Campigiana". This is where apprentices and students and staff meet for coffee and a croissant or a healthy smoothie. At lunchtime, burgers, club sandwiches and salad are served. In the evening, the bar becomes a meeting place for students and apprentices.

The Essence 

At "The Essence" the core of a gastronomic education is trained. In the upper part of the dining room, students and trainees learn how to make large pièces in a classical manner and how to arrange them on plates. Two types of service are trained. The first is a Guéridon platter service, in which pièces are prepared and carved in front of the guest, and the second is a banquet service. As a guest, you will receive a classic freshly prepared 3-course menu including wine service.

The Market 
The second part of the dining room is the self-service restaurant "The Market". Apprentices and students as well as staff can help themselves to three buffets. There is a salad, a vegetarian and a meat main course and dessert. Some dishes are prepared in a marché style directly in front of the guests.

Cooperation and partnerships 
Over the years, EHL SSTH has built up various cooperations and maintains close relations with various partners from the hospitality industry. 

Particularly close partnerships exist with Campus Tourismus Graubünden and Hotelleriesuisse. The EHL Passugg is closely connected with Campus Tourismus Graubünden for the educational mission in the region. Hotelleriesuisse provides a representative on the board of directors of the EHL SSTH.

References

External links 

 Official website

Hospitality schools in Switzerland
Tourism in Switzerland